Moore Yaski Sivan architects, or MYS architects, is an architecture firm in Israel. It was founded in 1965 by Avraham Yaski, and has been involved in some of the most high-profile skyscraper projects in the country, such as the Azrieli Center, YOO Towers and Tzameret Towers.

The firm
MYS architects is a result of the fusion of the Yaski–Sivan Architects firm, conducted by Yossi Sivan and Avraham Yaski, and the Moore Architects firm, conducted by Yitzhak Moore and Amihud Moore, taking place in 2006. As of 2019, MYS Architects is the largest architecture firm in Israel, listing around 150 professional employees.

Projects

MYS Architects' portfolio comprises residential and office skyscraper, malls, medical centers, hotels and urban design, with projects undertaken in countries all over the world, such as England, Greece, Cyprus, Vietnam, India, Poland, Romania, Serbia, Ukraine, Russia, Albania, Bosnia, Bulgaria, Croatia, Czech Republic, Georgia, Hungary, Kazakhstan and Montenegro.

MYS architects has been involved in the following projects:

References

External links
Official website

Architecture firms of Israel